Pita Matar Amanat  is a 2008 Bangladeshi film directed by F I Manik and produced by Manna. It starts Manna, Purnima and Apu Biswas in the lead roles. It was the eighth film produced by Manna.

Cast
Manna 
Purnima 
Apu Biswas
Razzak 
Kabari 
Sadek Bachchu 
Danny Sidak
Shiba Shanu 
Jamilur Rahman Shakha 
Jackie Alamgir

Music
The film's songs have been composed by Emon Saha and penned by Mohammad Rafiquzzaman.

"Bondhu Rongila" - Kumar Bishwajit, Dolly Sayontoni

References

External links
Bangladesh Film Archive

2008 films
Bengali-language Bangladeshi films
2000s Bengali-language films
Films scored by Emon Saha